Louis Pasteur University (Université Louis-Pasteur), also known as Strasbourg I or ULP was a large university in Strasbourg, Alsace, France. As of 15 January 2007, there were 18,847 students enrolled at the university, including around 3,000 foreign students. Research and teaching at ULP concentrated on the natural sciences, technology and medicine. On 1 January 2009, Louis Pasteur University became part of the refounded University of Strasbourg and lost its status as an independent university.

The university was a member of the LERU (League of European Research Universities). It was named after the famous 19th-century French scientist Louis Pasteur. Nineteen Nobel laureates and two laureates of the Fields Medal have studied, taught or conducted research at Louis Pasteur University, underlining the excellent reputation of the university.

Notable staff and students
 Louis Pasteur (1822–1895), professor of chemistry
 Adolf von Baeyer (1835–1917), professor of chemistry, Nobel Prize in 1905
 Charles Louis Alphonse Laveran (1845–1922), medical student, Nobel Prize in 1907
 Wilhelm Röntgen (1845–1923), lecturer in physics, Nobel Prize in 1901
 Karl Ferdinand Braun (1850–1918), professor of physics, Nobel Prize in 1909
 Hermann Emil Fischer (1851–1919), graduate student in chemistry, Nobel Prize in 1902
 Albrecht Kossel (1853–1927), physician and biochemist, Nobel Prize in 1910
 Paul Ehrlich (1854–1915), medical student, Nobel Prize in 1908
 Pieter Zeeman (1865–1943), postdoctoral fellow, Nobel Prize in 1902
 Otto Loewi (1873–1961), medical student, Nobel Prize in 1936
 Albert Schweitzer (1875–1965), theologian, musician, philosopher, and physician, Nobel Prize in 1952
 Max von Laue (1879–1960), undergraduate student in mathematics and physics, Nobel Prize in 1914
 Hermann Staudinger (1881–1965), professor of chemistry, Nobel Prize in 1953
 Otto Fritz Meyerhof (1884–1951), medical student, Nobel Prize in 1922
 Alfred Kastler (1902–1984), graduate student in physics, Nobel Prize in 1966
 Louis Néel (1904–2000), graduate student in physics, Nobel Prize in 1970
 Laurent Schwartz (1915–2002), graduate student in mathematics, Fields Medal in 1950
 René Thom (1923–2002), professor of mathematics, Fields Medal in 1958
 Martin Karplus (1930–), professor of chemistry, Nobel Prize in 2013
 Pierre Chambon (1931–), professor of biology, Lasker Award in 2004, Gairdner Award in 2010
 Jean-Marie Lehn (1939–), professor of chemistry, Nobel Prize in 1987
 Yves Meyer (1940–), graduate student in mathematics, Abel Prize in 2017
 Jules Hoffmann (1941–), professor of biology, Nobel Prize in 2011
 Jean-Pierre Sauvage (1944–), professor of chemistry, Nobel Prize in 2016
 Pascal Mayer (1963–), undergraduate and graduate student in biophysics, Breakthrough Prize in Life Sciences in 2022
 Philippe Horvath (1970–), undergraduate and graduate student in biology, Gairdner Award in 2016
 Yvonne Libona Bonzi Coulibaly, professor of chemistry, African Union Kwame Nkrumah Prize in 2013
 Mounir Majidi

Points of interest
 Jardin botanique de l'Université de Strasbourg
 Musée zoologique de l'ULP et de la ville de Strasbourg

Notes and references

See also
 University of Strasbourg
 École européenne de chimie, polymères et matériaux, the European school of chemistry

External links
 Official university website

1567 establishments in the Holy Roman Empire
University of Strasbourg
Defunct universities and colleges in France
Educational institutions established in 1970